The National Council is the upper chamber of Namibia's bicameral Parliament. It reviews bills passed by the lower chamber and makes recommendations for legislation of regional concern to the lower chamber.

The 42 National Council members are indirectly elected by regional councils for a term of five years. Each of the 14 regional councils chooses three of its members to serve on the National Council. The last regional council elections were held on 25 November 2020.

Political party distribution in the  National Council is as follows:
 South West Africa People's Organisation (SWAPO) - 28 seats
 Landless People's Movement (LPM) - 6 seats
 Independent Patriots for Change (IPC) - 2 seats
 United Democratic Front (UDF) - 2 seats
 Popular Democratic Movement (PDM) - 2 seats
 National Unity Democratic Organisation (NUDO) - 1 seat
 Independent - 1 seat

The National Council meets in the capital Windhoek in the National Council Building next to the Tintenpalast. The chairperson as of December 2020 is Lukas Muha.

Election results

See also

National Assembly of Namibia - the lower chamber of Parliament
History of Namibia
Legislative Branch
List of Chairpersons of the National Council of Namibia
List of national legislatures

References

 
Government of Namibia
Namibia
Windhoek
Parliament of Namibia
1993 establishments in Namibia